YouTube Studio, formerly known as YouTube Creator Studio, is a platform provided by YouTube where content creators may control their online presence, channel expansion, audience engagement, and monetary gain. This feature's goals are to help YouTubers manage their channels, acquire growth-oriented information, and keep up with current events.

History 
In 2005, Creator Studio Classic was first produced by YouTube. In 2019, there was a major revamp of YouTube Studio to conform to Google's Material Design user interface. This is due to the fact that Creator Studio Classic employed outdated technology and software. As a result, employing an older software to incorporate new technologies and capabilities into this feature would take a long time.

By November 2019, access to Creator Studio Classic was progressively being eliminated in favor of the revamped and rebranded "YouTube Studio," which will serve as an replacement for the feature for the approximately 150,000 creators who relied on it. The number of YouTube channels affected by this adjustment increased from 1% in January 2020 to 10% in February 2020 to 100% in April 2020.

Features 
YouTube Studio mobile application and computer program both have lot of customized and personalized features that vary from creator to creator, channel to channel and country to country.

Dashboard 
The most recent news, a variety of channel analytics, recent subscribers, Creator Insider videos, a card for channel suggestions, the most recent comments, the most recent updates to YouTube Studio, and the known issues on YouTube Studio can all be found in this tab.

Content 
In this area, the user can check and/or filter regular videos, YouTube Shorts and/or live feeds. The videos and their information are also arranged in a table. A creator can examine a wide range of options when they hover on a row, including changing the video, promoting it, viewing its statistics, and more. The video's visibility (public, unlisted, or private), available limitations (copyright claim), a publication date, a view count, a comment count, and a like-to-dislike ratio are additional details arranged in columns.

Analytics 
Different channel analytics are displayed in this tab, including views, subscriber data, real-time/live statistics, video performance statistics, and information on the most recent video. Additional tabs for channel analytics include those for reach (impressions, impressions through click-rate, views, unique viewers, and more), engagement (watch time in hours, average view duration, and more), and audience (unique viewers, average views per viewer, subscribers and more). As a more precise method of viewing the subscriber count without the brevity subscriber count update, the tab also displays a real-time subscriber count.

Copyright 
In this tab of YouTube Studio, creators can manage copyright infringement of their content by submitting new removal request, actively checking which content is uploaded by other creators, by contacting other creators through message or many other features provided by YouTube.

Playlists 
The public, unlisted, and private playlists can all be seen and edited through this page, but only outside of YouTube Studio. The thumbnail, title, visibility, description, and addition and/or removal of specific videos are all editable in playlists.

Monetization 
Any video can be monetized by the creator by adding adverts in order to profit from users watching it. Although this option is available for all channels, not all channels can access monetization because the channel must meet certain criteria in order to do so, including having 1,000 members and 4,000 public view hours in the previous year. The watch hour time for shorts has not been included since the launch of YouTube Shorts.

Comments 
This tab displays the most recent published comments, on-hold comments, and spam comments. This contains all of the user's comments from each video, but you can add filters to it, like "I haven't answered," which only shows comments the user hasn't replied to.

Subtitles 
All of the user's uploaded videos can have their closed captions edited using this tab. One can activate or disable community contributions, and if enabled, any user will be able to provide custom subtitles to certain of the creator's videos.

Customization 
This tab allows creators to customize their YouTube channels by adding Channel Trailers, up to ten Featured Sections, Featured Channels, changing their Profile Picture, adding a Banner Image, adding a Video Watermark, adding their Channel Description, adding their Channel Links, and adding their Contact Information.

Music Library 
When a creator clicks on this tab, they are directed to an external link that contains a lengthy list of royalty- and copyright-free music that they can use to alter the videos on their channel.

Settings 
On this tab, the creators can manage their YouTube channel settings, general setting, permissions default uploads, community and agreements.

See also 

 YouTube
 YouTube Shorts
 YouTube Rewind
 YouTube Live
 YouTube Creator Awards
 YouTube Premium
 YouTube Music
 YouTube TV
 YouTube Kids
 YouTube Space

References 

YouTube

External links 

 Official website

 
Google acquisitions